Alan Richard Shapiro (born February 18, 1952 in Boston, Massachusetts) is an American poet and professor of English and creative writing at the University of North Carolina, Chapel Hill.

Shapiro's poetry books include Tantalus in Love, Song and Dance, and Dead Alive and Busy.  In addition to poetry, Shapiro has published two personal memoirs, Vigil and The Last Happy Occasion.

Bibliography

Poetry collections
The Courtesy
Happy Hour
Covenant
Mixed Company
The Last Happy Occasion
Vigil
After the Digging
The Dead Alive and Busy
Song and Dance
Tantalus in Love
Old War
Night of the Republic
Reel to Reel

List of poems

Essays

Awards and honors

Wallace Stegner Creative Writing Fellowship in poetry, Stanford University, 1975–76 
Academy of American Poets Award, Stanford University, 1976
Illinois Arts Council Award (Happy Hour, Bedtime Story,Genie), 1984 
National Endowment for the Arts Fellowship in poetry, 1984–85 
Guggenheim Fellowship in poetry, 1985–86 
Nomination for National Book Critics' Circle Award (Happy Hour), 1987
Robert and Hazel Ferguson Memorial Award (Happy Hour), 1987
William Carlos Williams Award (Happy Hour), 1987 
Illinois Arts Council Award (Maison des Jeunes), 1988
Lila Wallace-Reader's Digest Writers Award, 1991 
National Endowment for the Arts Fellowship in poetry, 1991 
John H. McGinnis Award for best essay (Fanatics), 1995
Los Angeles Times Book Award in poetry (Mixed Company), 1996
Finalist for National Book Circle Critics Award (The Last Happy Occasion ), 1996
Publishers Weekly Best Book of the Year (The Last Happy Occasion), 1996 
Pushcart Prize - Essay (Fanatics), 1996 
New England Book Sellers Association Discovery of the Month Award (Vigil), 1997
Undergraduate Teaching Award, University of North Carolina, Chapel Hill, 1998 
Arts Fellowship from The Project on Death in America of the Open Society Institute, 1999 
Institute for the Arts and Humanities Fellowship, UNC (spring), 1999 
O .B. Hardison Jr. Poetry Prize, from the Folger Library, 1999 
Kingsley Tufts Poetry Award (Dead Alive and Busy), 2001
American Academy of Arts and Letters Writer's Award, 2002 
Roanoke-Chowan Award - NC Literary and Historical Society, (Song & Dance), 2003
Elected Fellow to the American Academy of Arts and Sciences, 2005  
Roanoke-Chowan Award (Tantalus in Love ), 2005 
Sara Teasdale Award - Wellesley College,  2005
Ambassador Book Award - English Speaking Union of the United States (Old War), 2009
Finalist for National Book Award in poetry, 2012

References

External links
University of North Carolina: http://www.unc.edu
UNC English and creative program: http://englishcomplit.unc.edu/creative/faculty
Page of Alan Shapiro on UNC website: https://web.archive.org/web/20150928225157/http://englishcomplit.unc.edu/people/shapiroa
Page of Alan Shapiro on Amazon": https://www.amazon.com/Alan-Shapiro/e/B000APXGVK/ref=sr_tc_2_0?qid=1443446284&sr=1-2-ent

1952 births
Living people
Writers from Boston
Poets from Massachusetts
American male poets
American academics of English literature
The New Yorker people
20th-century American poets
21st-century American poets
University of North Carolina at Chapel Hill faculty
20th-century American male writers
21st-century American male writers
20th-century American non-fiction writers
21st-century American non-fiction writers
American male non-fiction writers